Comcast Center is a skyscraper in Philadelphia, Pennsylvania, that houses the headquarters of Comcast Corporation.

Comcast Center may also refer to:

 Comcast Center, former name of Xfinity Center (College Park, Maryland), an arena at the University of Maryland, US
 Comcast Center, former name of Xfinity Center (Mansfield, Massachusetts), an amphitheater outside of Boston, US

See also 
 Comcast Technology Center, a skyscraper in Center City, Philadelphia, US
 Comcast Building, the current official name of 30 Rockefeller Plaza, a skyscraper in New York City, US